Scar tissue may refer to:

Medicine 
 Scar, an area of fibrous tissue that replaces normal skin after injury
 Granulation tissue, a product of healing in major wounds

Film and television
 Scar Tissue (1975 film), or Wanted: Babysitter, a film by René Clément
 Scar Tissue (2002 film), a television movie starring Roberta Maxwell
 Scar Tissue (2012 film), a film featuring Helen George
 "Scar Tissue" (The Punisher), a television episode
 "Scar Tissue" (The Shield), a television episode

Literature
 Scar Tissue (autobiography), a 2004 autobiography by Anthony Kiedis
 Scar Tissue (novel), a 1993 novel by Michael Ignatieff

Music
 Scar Tissue (band), an American electro-industrial group
 "Scar Tissue", a song by Red Hot Chili Peppers, 1999
 "Scar Tissue", a song by Camila Cabello from Camila, 2018
 "Scar Tissue", a song by Five Finger Death Punch from F8, 2020